Cave-Browne-Cave is a surname. Notable people with the surname include:

Any one of the Cave-Browne-Cave baronets
Beatrice Mabel Cave-Browne-Cave, English mathematician and sister of Frances
Frances Cave-Browne-Cave, English mathematician
Genille Cave-Browne-Cave, 12th baronet
Henry Cave-Browne-Cave, RAF officer

Compound surnames